The 2022 Melbourne 400 (know for commercial purpose as the 2022 Beaurepaires Melbourne 400) was a motor racing event held as a part of the 2022 Supercars Championship from Friday 8 April to Sunday 10 April 2022. The event was held at the Albert Park Circuit in Melbourne, Victoria. It was the third round of the 2022 Supercars Championship and consisted of four races of 106.040 kilometres each.

Results

Race 1

Race 2

Race 3

Race 4

Championship standings after the race

Drivers' Championship standings

Teams Championship standings

 Note: Only the top five positions are included for standings.

References

Melbourne 400
Melbourne 400